Strathord railway station served the village of Luncarty, Perth and Kinross, Scotland, from 1849 to 1931 on the Scottish Midland Junction Railway.

History 
The station opened as Dunkeld Road on 17 May 1849 by the Scottish Midland Junction Railway. To the north was the goods yard, to the south was a siding and on the northbound platform was a signal box. The station's name was changed to Strathord in February 1857. Around this time, the services were reduced to Tuesday, Friday and Saturday. A daily service resumed in January 1867. A second platform was added in 1906 when the Bankfoot Light Railway opened. The station closed on 13 April 1931.

References

External links 

Disused railway stations in Perth and Kinross
Railway stations in Great Britain opened in 1849
Railway stations in Great Britain closed in 1931
1849 establishments in Scotland
1931 disestablishments in Scotland